Laura Isabel González González (born 8 February 1993) is a Colombian rugby sevens player. She was selected for the Colombian women's national rugby sevens team to the 2016 Summer Olympics.

References

External links 
 
 

1993 births
Living people
Female rugby sevens players
Rugby sevens players at the 2016 Summer Olympics
Colombia international rugby sevens players
Olympic rugby sevens players of Colombia
Rugby sevens players at the 2015 Pan American Games
Colombia international women's rugby sevens players
21st-century Colombian women